John Turnbull (5 November 1880 – 23 February 1956) was a British stage and film actor. He was married to Eve Marchew and Beatrice Alice Scott (actress).

Selected filmography

 The Amazing Quest of Mr. Ernest Bliss (1920) - Willie Mott
 Tons of Money (1930) - Sprules
 Rodney Steps In (1931, Short) - Inspector
 77 Park Lane (1931) - Superintendent
 The Man at Six (1931) - Inspector Dawford
 Keepers of Youth (1931) - Gordon Duff
 Detective Lloyd (1932, Serial) - Barclay - Scotland Yard Superindendant
 Murder on the Second Floor (1932) - Inspector
 The Wickham Mystery (1932) - Howard Clayton
 A Voice Said Goodnight (1932, Short) - Inspector Lavory
 The Midshipmaid (1932) - Officer
 The Iron Stair (1933) - Major Gordon
 The Shadow (1933) - Det. Inspector Carr
 The Private Life of Henry VIII (1933) - Hans Holbein (uncredited)
 Too Many Wives (1933) - (uncredited)
 The Umbrella (1933) - Governor
 The Medicine Man (1933) - Police Inspector
 The Man Outside (1933) - Inspector Jukes
 Puppets of Fate (1933) - Supt. Desabine
 Matinee Idol (1933) - Inspector North
 Ask Beccles (1933) - Inspector Daniels
 The Scotland Yard Mystery (1934) - Angry Director of Insurance Company (uncredited)
 The Black Abbot (1934) - Detective Inspector Lockwood
 The Rise of Catherine the Great (1934) - Rumyantsev (uncredited)
 The Lady Is Willing (1934) - Butler (uncredited)
 Tangled Evidence (1934) - Moore
 It's a Cop (1934) - Inspector Gray
 Passing Shadows (1934) - Inspector Goodall
 Warn London (1934) - Inspector Frayne
 Music Hall (1934) - Collins
 The Girl in the Flat (1934) - Inspector Grice
 Lord Edgware Dies (1934) - Inspector Japp
 What Happened to Harkness? (1934) - Inspector Marlow
 Badger's Green (1934) - Thomas Butler
 The Case for the Crown (1934) - Prof. Lawrence
 The Scarlet Pimpernel (1934) - Jellyband
 Once in a New Moon (1934) - Capt. Crump
 The Lad (1935) - Inspector Martin
 A Real Bloke (1935) - (uncredited)
 Radio Pirates (1935) - Senior Police Officer (uncredited)
 The 39 Steps (1935) - Scottish Police Inspector (uncredited)
 The Night of the Party (1935) - Insp. Ramage
 The Passing of the Third Floor Back (1935) - Major Tomkin
 Line Engaged (1935) - Supt. Harrison
 The Black Mask (1935) - Inspector Murray
 Sexton Blake and the Bearded Doctor (1935) - Inspector Donnell
 Excuse My Glove (1936) - Boxing Promoter (uncredited)
 Soft Lights and Sweet Music (1936) - Gramophone Factory Director (uncredited)
 Music Hath Charms (1936) - Barrister
 Tudor Rose (1936) - Arundel (uncredited)
 The Amazing Quest of Ernest Bliss (1936) - Masters
 Where There's a Will (1936) - Detective Collins
 The Limping Man (1936) - Insp. Potts
 Hearts of Humanity (1936) - Mr. Willis
 Rembrandt (1936) - Minister
 His Lordship (1936) - Stevenson
 Conquest of the Air (1936) - Ferdinand Von Zeppelin
 Shipmates o' Mine (1936) - Captain Roberts
 The Song of the Road (1937) - Bristow
 The Angelus (1937) - (uncredited)
 Make-Up (1937) - Karo
 Silver Blaze (1937) - Inspector Lestrade
 Talking Feet (1937) - Lord Mayor (uncredited)
 Saturday Night Revue (1937) - Minor Role (uncredited)
 Death Croons the Blues (1937)
 It's a Grand Old World (1937) - Auctioneer
 Star of the Circus (1938) - Tenzler
 Stepping Toes (1938) - Representative
 Strange Boarders (1938) - (uncredited)
 The Terror (1938) - Superintendent Hallick
 Night Alone (1938) - Superintendent
 The Gaunt Stranger (1938) - Prison Governor (uncredited)
 Dead Men are Dangerous (1939) - Inspector Roberts
 Spies of the Air (1939) - Sir Andrew Hamilton
 Inspector Hornleigh on Holiday (1939) - Chief Constable
 Return to Yesterday (1940) - Station-master
 Three Silent Men (1940) - Inspector Gill
 Spare a Copper (1940) - Inspector Richards
 Old Mother Riley's Circus (1941) - Cinema Manager
 The Common Touch (1941) - Father at School Cricket Match
 Hard Steel (1942) - Mr. Rowlandson
 The Shipbuilders (1943) - Baird
 Fanny by Gaslight (1944) - Magistrate (uncredited)
 Don't Take It to Heart (1944) - Police Sergeant
 A Place of One's Own (1945) - Sir Roland Jervis
 The Hangman Waits (1947) - Inspector
 So Well Remembered (1947) - Morris
 Daybreak (1948) - Superintendent
 The Man from Yesterday (1949) - Judge
 The Happiest Days of Your Life (1950) - Conrad Matthews (final film role)

References

External links

1880 births
1956 deaths
Scottish male stage actors
Scottish male film actors
People from Dunbar
20th-century Scottish male actors